Adnan Ghaleb al-Husayni (born 1946) was the Palestinian governor of Jerusalem and of the Quds Governorate between 2008 and 2018  when he was succeeded by Adnan Ghaith. He is also Waqf supervisor and a member of the Palestinian National Authority Higher Council of Tourism. He belongs to the well-known al-Husayni family of Jerusalem, where he was born.

History
In 1971, al-Husayni received a BA in architecture from Ain Shams University in Cairo, Egypt. Afterwards he began working as General-Manager and Supervisor of the Jerusalem Islamic Waqf. He served as head of the Palestinian Housing Council in Palestinian territories in 1999–2002. Since 1999, he has been a member of the Higher Council of Tourism.

References
Adnan al-Husseini Profile

Notes

1946 births
Living people
Palestinian politicians
People from Jerusalem
Adnan
Governors of Jerusalem Governorate

Government ministers of the State of Palestine
Government ministers of the Palestinian National Authority

Ibrahimieh College alumni
20th-century Palestinian people
Members of the Executive Committee of the Palestine Liberation Organization